K-43 was a  nuclear-powered cruise missile submarine operated by the Soviet and Indian navies. It was built between 1964 and 1967 and was commissioned into the Soviet navy on 5 November 1967. It later served as INS Chakra in the Indian Navy from 1988 to 1991.

It was leased to India on 1 September 1987 and reached its base in Visakhapatnam on 3 February 1988 after a long journey. The Soviets said that the submarine was transferred for helping train the Indian Navy in operating nuclear submarines. During its service with India, it was partially manned by a Soviet crew, who reportedly did not allow Indians into the missile room and into the reactor compartment and this is believed to be a reason for the termination of the contract after 3 years.

Description 
It displaced  surfaced and  while submerged. The complement of the submarine was about 100.

The boat had one five-blade propeller powered by a VM-5 pressurised water reactor. It can achieve a maximum speed of  when surfaced and  when submerged. The K-43 could carry up to 8 SS-N-7 Starbright nuclear capable anti-ship cruise missiles. It had six  torpedo tubes which could carry 12 torpedoes or 12 SS-N-15 Starfish anti-submarine missiles.

History 
In October 1986, the Soviet Politburo declared that they intend to transfer a Charlie-class submarine to India for training purposes. It was the first time a nuclear submarine was ever transferred to any other country. It was decided so as to prove Soviet Union's commitment to strengthening India. But some politicians expressed serious negative consequences due to the transfer. However, the politburo headed by Gorbachev decided that the political benefits outweighs the concerns.

The Soviets, during the lease to India, would regularly inspect the submarine and handle the nuclear fuel. The Soviet media stated that the submarine would not carry any nuclear weapons.

Transfer to India 
A new naval base was constructed at Visakhapatnam with the help of the Soviet Union for handling the submarine. An Indian crew reached a training centre at Kirova for a two-year training course. The Indian Ambassador, Nurul Hasan, visited the Indian crew during this time.

Operational history 
The submarine was built between 1964 and 1967 and was commissioned into the Soviet navy on 5 November 1967. After returning to the Soviet Union after its lease to India, it continued to be in service with the Soviet Navy and was finally decommissioned on 30 July 1992 and sold for scrap.

Service in the Indian Navy 

The submarine left for India on 5 January 1988 from Vladivostok and was commissioned into the Indian Navy on the same day. It passed through the South China Sea and Malacca Strait where it was escorted by an Indian frigate, . It was constantly tracked by American and Australian P-3 Orion aircraft throughout the journey. It arrived at Visakhapatnam on 3 February 1988. The submarine was welcomed by the Indian Prime Minister, Rajiv Gandhi, the Defence Minister, K. C. Pant, the Chief of Naval Staff, G. J. Nadkami, and the commander of Eastern Naval Command, Vice Admiral S. C. Chopra, who sailed in the submarine into the sea.

Chakra took part in the Presidential Fleet Review of 15 February 1989 at Mumbai when it was watched by millions of Indians on television. Transfer of the submarine gained widespread coverage in the international media with Time Magazine calling India an "Awakening Power", while the Washington Post called it an "Oriental Bully".

Contrary to popular perception, the Chakra was partially manned and control by the Soviet crew, who reportedly did not allow Indians into the missile room and into the reactor compartment despite repeated Indian requests and efforts, and this is believed to be a reason for the termination of the contract after 3 years by India.

The Chakra served in both the eastern and western fronts during her service. As the lease agreement ended, Chakra departed to the Soviet Union from Visakhapatnam on 16 December 1990 and was escorted by  throughout its journey. It was decommissioned in January 1991.

See also
India-Soviet Union Relations 
Submarines of the Indian Navy

References

Bibliography

Submarines of the Soviet Navy
Charlie-class submarines
Ships built in the Soviet Union
India–Soviet Union relations